Worachak Road is a road and neighbourhood in Bangkok. It's a short road in the area of Pom Prap Sattru Phai district and administrative boundary between Ban Bat, Pom Prap and Wat Thep Sirin sub-districts. It's starts from S.A.B. intersection in Samphanthawong district until end at Maen Si intersection near Wat Saket in Pom Prap Sattru Phai district.

Its name after HRH, Prince Pramoj, Prince Worachak, the son of King Phutthaloetla Naphalai (Rama II) and grandfather of M.R. Seni Pramoj and M.R. Kukrit Pramoj, who used to have the palace at this road cut through.

Worachak road built in 1898 during the reign of King Chulalongkorn (Rama V) after the project since 1896. Originally, there's a Chaloem Yot 45 bridge located here but to dismantle it to open the way to the road.

Currently, around Worachak road is a source of auto, motorbike and bicycle parts distributors. It's considered part of Khlong Thom. It's a destination for various street food vendors alike nearby Yaowarat road as well.

References 

Streets in Bangkok
Road junctions in Bangkok
Retail markets in Bangkok
Neighbourhoods of Bangkok
Pom Prap Sattru Phai district